Trinidad López III (May 15, 1937 – August 11, 2020) was an American singer, guitarist, and actor. His first album included a cover version of Pete Seeger's "If I Had a Hammer", which earned a Golden Disc for him. His other hits included "Lemon Tree", "I'm Comin' Home, Cindy" and "Sally Was a Good Old Girl". He designed two guitars for the Gibson Guitar Corporation, which are now collectors’ items. A documentary on his life and career, "My Name is Lopez" was released in April 2022.

Early life
Lopez was born in Dallas, Texas, on May 15, 1937. His father, Trinidad Lopez II, worked as a singer, dancer, actor, and musician in Mexico; his mother was Petra Gonzalez. They married in their hometown of Moroleón, Guanajuato, prior to moving to Dallas.  Lopez had four sisters (two are deceased) and a brother, Jesse, who is also a singer. He grew up on Ashland Street in the Little Mexico neighborhood of Dallas and attended grammar school and N.R. Crozier Tech High School. He dropped out of high school in his senior year in order to earn money to help support the family.

Career
Lopez formed his first band in Wichita Falls, Texas, at the age of 15. Around 1955/56 Lopez and his band worked at The Vegas Club, a nightclub owned by Jack Ruby, the man who assassinated Lee Harvey Oswald. In 1957, at the recommendation of Buddy Holly's father, Trini and his group "The Big Beats" went to producer Norman Petty in Clovis, New Mexico. Petty secured a contract for them with Columbia Records, which released the single "Clark's Expedition"/"Big Boy", both instrumental. Lopez left the group and made his first solo recording, his own composition "The Right To Rock", for the Dallas-based Volk Records, and then signed with King Records in 1959, recording more than a dozen singles for that label, none of which charted.

In late 1962, after the King contract expired, Lopez followed up on an offer by producer Snuff Garrett to join the post-Holly Crickets as vocalist. After a few weeks of auditions in Los Angeles, that idea did not go through. He landed a steady engagement at the nightclub PJ's, where his audience grew quickly. He was heard there by Frank Sinatra, who had started his own label, Reprise Records, and who subsequently signed Lopez.

His debut live album, Trini Lopez at PJ's (R/RS 6093), was released in 1963. The album included a version of Pete Seeger's "If I Had a Hammer", which reached number one in 36 countries (no. 3 in the United States), and was a radio favorite for many years. It sold over one million copies and was awarded a gold disc. He also performed his own version of the traditional Mexican song "La Bamba" on the album; his recording of the tune was later reissued as a single in 1966.  Another live album from PJ's was recorded later that same year under the title By Popular Demand More Trini Lopez at PJ's (R/RS 6103), which contains the song Green, Green which was written by Randy Sparks and Barry McGuire and originally recorded by the New Christy Minstrels earlier that year for their Columbia album Ramblin.

Lopez scored 13 chart singles through 1968, including "Lemon Tree" (1965), "I'm Comin' Home, Cindy" (1966), and "Sally Was a Good Old Girl" (1968). Later in 2013, Lopez told Portland Magazine, “People ask about ‘Lemon Tree’ all the time. It’s one of my most favorite requested songs. It’s a very catchy tune. I just happen to like the chorus.”  On the adult contemporary chart, he racked up 15 hits, including the top-10 singles "Michael" (1964), "Gonna Get Along Without Ya' Now" (1967), and "The Bramble Bush" (1967), which he sang in the movie The Dirty Dozen. Beyond his success on record, he became one of the country's top nightclub performers of that era, regularly headlining in Las Vegas. In 1968, he recorded an album in Nashville entitled Welcome to Trini Country (R/RS 6300).

Lopez produced a single promoting the Coca-Cola soft drink Fresca in 1967. In 1969, NBC aired a Trini Lopez variety special featuring surf guitar group The Ventures, and Nancy Ames as guests.  The soundtrack, released as The Trini Lopez Show, has him singing his hits with The Ventures as his backing band.

He continued his musical career with extensive tours of Europe and Latin America during this period; an attempt to break out by releasing a disco album in 1978 proved a flop.

Later 
In 2002, Lopez teamed with Art Greenhaw for Legacy: My Texas Roots. The album used the "Texas Roots Combo" including Lopez, Greenhaw, and Lopez's brother, Jesse. Said reviewer Steve Leggett of AllMusic, "The album has an easygoing feel very similar to Lopez's classic live sets from the 1960s, only it rocks a good deal harder." Thereafter, Lopez focused on charitable work.

Lopez was still recording and appearing live in the years leading up to his death. He took part in a benefit concert to raise money for the victims of the 2004 Indian Ocean earthquake and tsunami, and appeared as a guest performer in a number of shows held in Maastricht in the Netherlands with the Dutch violinist and composer André Rieu. He continued to record; El Inmortal was released in 2010, and the following year he released his 65th album, Into The Future.

Gibson Guitars 
Lopez' popularity led the Gibson Guitar Corporation to ask him in 1964 to design a guitar for them. He ended up designing two: the Trini Lopez Standard, a rock and roll model based on the Gibson ES-335 semihollow body, and the Lopez Deluxe, a variation of a Gibson jazz guitar designed by Barney Kessel. Both of these guitars were in production from 1964 until 1971, and are now highly sought-after among collectors.  Owners of the guitar include Dave Grohl of Foo Fighters and Noel Gallagher of Oasis.

Acting career 
During the 1960s and 1970s, Lopez moved into acting, though his film career was not as successful as his music. Lopez's first film role was in Marriage on the Rocks (1965), in which he made a cameo appearance in a nightclub scene; Lopez's soundtrack song, "Sinner Man", became a hit single (no. 54 pop/no. 12 adult contemporary). He was one of The Dirty Dozen (1967), appeared as himself in The Phynx (1970), and played the title role in Claudio Guzman's Antonio (1973). He made two appearances (playing different characters) on the television program Adam-12. In 1977, he played the role of Julio Ramirez in “The Mystery of the Silent Scream” which was part of The Hardy Boys/Nancy Drew Mysteries TV series.

Honors, awards, distinctions 
 In 1993, a Golden Palm Star on the Palm Springs, California, Walk of Stars was dedicated to Lopez.
 He was inducted into the International Latin Music Hall of Fame in 2003.
 On May 15, 2008, his 71st birthday, Lopez was inducted into the Las Vegas Walk of Stars.
 In April 2022, a documentary film was released, My Name is Lopez, that includes a history of his life and career through archival and new performances and interviews.

Personal life 
Lopez remained a lifelong bachelor and had no children. His nephew, Trini Martinez, was the drummer for the Dallas indie rock band Bedhead.

Lopez died on August 11, 2020, at Desert Regional Medical Center in Palm Springs, California. He was 83, and suffered complications from COVID-19 during the COVID-19 pandemic in California.

Singles discography

Filmography

Albums 
Most albums are on the Reprise label, unless otherwise indicated.

1963 Trini Lopez at PJ's (#2 Billboard 200)
1963 More Trini Lopez at PJ's (#11 Billboard 200)
1964 On the Move (#32 Billboard 200)
1964 Live at Basin St. East (#30 Billboard 200)
1964 Trini Lopez Plays and Sings
1964 The Latin Album (#18 Billboard 200)
1965 The Folk Album (#18 Billboard 200)
1965 The Love Album (#32 Billboard 200)
1965 The Rhythm and Blues Album (#46 Billboard 200)
1965 The Sing Along World of Trini Lopez (#101 Billboard 200)
1965 Trini Lopez Live in South Africa
1966 Trini (#54 Billboard 200)
1966 The Second Latin Album (#110 Billboard 200)
1966 Greatest Hits (#47 Billboard 200)
1967 Trini Lopez In London (#114 Billboard 200)
1967 Now! (#162 Billboard 200)
1968 It's a Great Life
1968 Welcome to Trini Country
1969 The Whole Enchilada
1969 The Trini Lopez Show
1971 Trini Lopez Live in Tokyo
1972 Viva
1977 Y Su Alma Latina
1978 Transformed By Time
1991 The 25th Anniversary Album
1998 Dance Party
2000 Aylole-Aylola
2001 Dance the Night Away
2002 Legacy: My Texas Roots
2005 Romantic and Sexy Guitars
2008 Ramblin' Man
2011 Into the Future, Trilo Records

Use of music
 His recording of "Cielito Lindo" was used in the 1989 film Born on the Fourth of July.

References

External links

General links 
 Official site, with detailed biography
 Trini Lopez at Texas Music Source, from the Texas Monthly website

Interviews 
 
 
 
 
 NAMM Oral History Interview August 11, 2006

 

1937 births
2020 deaths
Spanish-language singers of the United States
Latin-language singers of the United States
Musicians from Dallas
American musicians of Mexican descent
American male pop singers
King Records artists
Chicano rock musicians
Guitarists from Texas
20th-century American guitarists
American male guitarists
20th-century American singers
20th-century American male singers
21st-century American guitarists
21st-century American singers
People from Palm Springs, California
Death in Riverside County, California
Deaths from the COVID-19 pandemic in California
21st-century American male singers